The following is a comparative list of smartphones belonging to the OnePlus brand of devices, all using the Android operating system.

Current devices

10 series

9 series

8 series

Nord series 
<div class="overflowbugx" style="overflow:auto; width:100%;">

Discontinued but still supported devices

Discontinued and unsupported devices

See also
 Comparison of OnePlus TVs
List of Android smartphones
 Comparison of smartphones

References 

Android (operating system) devices
OnePlus mobile phones
OnePlus
OnePlus
OnePlus smartphones